The Bachelor UK 2019 was the sixth and final series of the reality television series The Bachelor, which ran from 4 March 2019 to 14 March 2019, featuring Alex Marks as "The Bachelor". The series was aired again on Channel 5 and was presented by Mark Wright.

Description
The Bachelor UK last aired in 2012 and returned to Channel 5 on 4 March 2019. The premise of the show involves a single man choosing a winner from 17 single women, by eliminating them one-by-one after going on a series of dates. The bachelor meets the families of the final four women. The final two women meet the parents of the bachelor.

The bachelor for this series was 31 year old Alex Marks, a personal trainer from London.

Alicia Oates from Essex, was declared the winner of the 6th and final series.

Contestants
The 19 contestants were as follows:

Call-Out Order

 The contestant was eliminated at the rose ceremony
 The contestant was given a white rose
 The contestant went on two-on-one date and was given a rose prior to the Rose Ceremony
 The contestant was on a one-on-one date and was eliminated
 The contestant was given a rose at the Rose Ceremony and rejected it
 The contestant was on a two-on-one date and got eliminated
 The contestant was given a rose prior to the Rose Ceremony 
 The contestant was eliminated outside the rose ceremony
 The contestant quit the competition
 The contestant won the competition

Reception
Mel Evans of The Metro described previous series as "tired, predictable and a little offensive" but the new show as having "exceeded all expectations I had". She was impressed that three women, Gabriella Pisani, Natasha Mazaheri and Reanne Brown, rejected the bachelor and chose to leave the series.

References

External links

2019 British television seasons
UK 06